Natalie Sather (born March 12, 1985) is an American auto racing driver.

Racing career

Early career
Sather was first interested in racing when she was in kindergarten, bringing die-cast cars into show-and-tell. When she was 9 years old, Sather started racing after acquiring a go-kart. Upon winning a karting championship in 2001, she moved to sprint cars. When she was 17, in her fifth sprint car race, she was involved in a crash that created three compound fractures in her right leg, though she returned to racing four months later.

In 2007, she won the American Sprint Car Series Midwest Championship, the first female to win the title. She spent five seasons in the series, and won the ASCS Midwest championship.

Sather also made starts in the World of Outlaws, qualifying for a preliminary A-Main in 410 sprint cars at the 2007 Knoxville Nationals. The following year, she returned to Knoxville, and finished in the top 10 in the 360 Sprint Car points standings, along with winning Rookie of the Year.

To develop her racing, she attended the Skip Barber Racing School, Finish Line Racing School, Lyn St. James Women in Racing Program, and the Jimmy Sills Racing School.

NASCAR
In 2008, Sather was invited to NASCAR's Drive for Diversity Combine at South Boston Speedway, and was eventually named to the program's 2009 class. On April 11, 2009, Sather began racing asphalt super late models, finishing in the top-10, and competed full-time at Evergreen Speedway's  and  layouts; she finished fourth in the points standings, and was named rookie of the year. In 2010, she joined the Whelen All-American Series' Late Model division at South Boston, racing for Sellers Racing Inc., owned by Peyton Sellers and H.C. Sellers. In her first 17 races at the track, Sather recorded 13 top-fives and 15 top-10 finishes.

On March 29, 2012, Sather joined MAKE Motorsports to make her Camping World Truck Series debut. She later attempted to qualify at Iowa Speedway, but crashed before she could make a complete lap in qualifying. An emotional Sather in her interview said that this race was her last chance to make it into the sport and that because of her second straight DNQ, her future looked very bleak. Unfortunately, her fear was realized and she never competed in auto racing again after that weekend.

Post-racing career
In 2014, Sather was hired by the National Sprint League as the series' Marketing Director.

Personal life
The daughter of Brad and Tessa Sather, Sather is the eldest of three sisters, consisting of her, Whitney and Sidney. Her hobbies include shopping, dogs, hunting and fishing, and country music. In high school, Sather was captain of the cheerleading squad.

In 2003, Sather participated in the Miss North Dakota Teen USA pageant, being named Miss Congeniality. She returned to the pageant three years later, winning second runner-up.

In 2023 Sather married Paul Silva

Motorsports career results

NASCAR
(key) (Bold – Pole position awarded by qualifying time. Italics – Pole position earned by points standings or practice time. * – Most laps led.)

Camping World Truck Series

References

External links
 

1985 births
Living people
Racing drivers from North Dakota
NASCAR drivers
American female racing drivers
21st-century American women